David Edward Rouse (born 6 March 1976) is an English former footballer who played as a goalkeeper in the Football League for Macclesfield Town.

Career

As a youth Rouse was with Stockport County and then on Bury's books, before moving into coaching while playing semi-professional football. He worked for eight years at Manchester United, where he worked with young goalkeepers such as Luke Steele, Tom Heaton, Tommy Lee, Ben Amos, Sam Johnstone and Luke Daniels. In the 2006–07 season he was goalkeeping coach at Macclesfield Town, and played once for the first team in an injury crisis, in a 1–0 defeat to Barnet, making his Football League debut at the age of 30. He also worked with Rochdale and Wigan Athletic before joining Queens Park Rangers as goalkeeping coach in February 2008. He was first team goalkeeping coach at Loftus Road for four years. 

In December 2014, Rouse joined Al Ain in the United Arab Emirates as head goalkeeping coach. In his first season there, Al Ain won their 12th UAE Pro League League title and reached the knockout stages of the AFC Champions League. In September 2017, Rouse was named as the goalkeeping coach for the Chinese Taipei national football team. Rouse was appointed goalkeeping coach at Stoke City in December 2019. Rouse left his position at Stoke in November 2022.

Career statistics
Source:

References

1976 births
Living people
English footballers
People from Stockport
Association football goalkeepers
English Football League players
Stockport County F.C. players
Bury F.C. players
Hong Kong FC players
Macclesfield Town F.C. players
Manchester United F.C. non-playing staff
Queens Park Rangers F.C. non-playing staff
English expatriate footballers
Expatriate footballers in Hong Kong
Manchester City F.C. non-playing staff
Stoke City F.C. non-playing staff